The 2016 Vietnamese National Football Second League was the 18th season of the Vietnamese National Football Second League. The season began on 12 April 2016 and finished on 22 July 2016.

Rule changes
In this season, 7 teams each group will play home & away. At the end of the qualifying round, the worst team in both two groups will be relegated to 2017 Vietnamese National Football Third League. And the top team of each group will be qualified to final round.
In final round, the winner will be promoted to 2017 V.League 2.

Team changes
The following teams have changed division since the 2015 season.

To Vietnamese Second League
Promoted from Vietnamese Third League
 Hà Nội T&T B
 Viettel B
 An Giang
 PVF (replace Trẻ Đồng Nai)

Relegated from V.League 2
 Công An Nhân Dân

From Vietnamese Second League
Relegated to Vietnamese Third League
 Kon Tum
Promoted to V.League 2
 Viettel
 Fico Tây Ninh
 Cà Mau

Qualifying round

Group A

Group B

 Final round PVF''' promoted to 2017 V.League 2.

See also  
 2016 V.League 1
 2016 V.League 2
 2016 Vietnamese National Football Third League

References

2016 in Vietnamese football